Marco Frigerio (born 16 July 2001) is an Italian professional footballer who plays as a midfielder for  club Foggia.

Club career
On 22 July 2022, Frigerio signed a two-year contract with Foggia.

References

External links

2001 births
Living people
People from Carate Brianza
Footballers from Lombardy
Italian footballers
Association football midfielders
Serie C players
A.C. Milan players
Lucchese 1905 players
Calcio Foggia 1920 players
Sportspeople from the Province of Monza e Brianza